Mark O'Connor (born 19 March 1945) is an Australian poet, writer, and environmental activist. He has published several books of poetry on regions of Australia such as the Great Barrier Reef and the Blue Mountains, often collaborating with renowned nature photographers. He has also written two books on the issue of overpopulation, This Tired Brown Land (1998) and, more recently, Overloading Australia (2008, co-written by William J. Lines).

Biography 

O'Connor has won several national and international prizes and awards, and he has undertaken fellowships throughout the world including United States, Europe, Russia, China and India. In 1999 he was appointed H.C. Coombs Creative Arts Fellow at the Australian National University, and in 2000 he was given a grant from the Australia Council to write poetry about the 2000 Olympic Games. He is also the editor of the much re-printed Oxford anthology Two Centuries of Australian Poetry.

In addition to his own poetry, O'Connor is now translating Shakespearean verse into modern English. He is also the inventor and patent holder for the Pro-NOUNCE-it software for showing the pronunciation of English words.

O'Connor was a candidate for NSW Senator at the 2010 Australian federal election, representing the Stable Population Party. He ran again for the senate in the 2013 Australian federal election.

References

External links 
 Mark O'Connor's official site
 Brief bio at AustLit Agent

Australian poets
Australian environmentalists
Australian non-fiction writers
Australian people of Irish descent
Non-fiction environmental writers
Sustainability advocates
Living people
1945 births
Translators of William Shakespeare